Fresh is a British pop punk band formed in London in 2015 by Kathryn Woods (vocals/guitar), with George Phillips (bass) and Daniel Goldberg (drums) joining in 2016. The current lineup is completed by Myles McCabe (guitar), who joined in 2017. They have released three albums and four EPs.

History
Fresh was started in London in 2015 by songwriter Kathryn Woods (vocals/guitar). George Phillips (bass) and Daniel Goldberg (drums) joined the live band in 2016, and would go on to play on its debut album. The current lineup is completed by Myles McCabe (guitar), who joined in 2017.

After self-releasing two EPs in 2015, the band signed to Specialist Subject Records and released their self-titled debut album on 18 August 2017. The album was recorded at The Ranch in Southampton.

In July 2017, they were featured in Kerrang! who compared them to Modern Baseball, Joyce Manor, and Diet Cig. The article quotes Kathryn as saying, "Fresh started because I was a teenage girl who was bored of only seeing men playing in bands".

In December 2017, ABC News listed their debut album as one of their 50 best albums of that year.

In February 2019, Fresh announced their second album Withdraw would be released on 7 June, unveiling lead single "Willa" (named after Willa Cather).

On 9 March 2021, the band released the single "Girl Clout". Then on 19 April they announced it was from a new EP that was to be released on 30 April, entitled The Summer I Got Good At Guitar, as well as unveiling a second single - "My Redemption Arc".

Since 2018's "Daytime" / "Nighttime" AA single everything has been recorded with Rich Mandell of the band Happy Accidents. Mandell also plays in the band Me Rex led by McCabe and of which Woods is also a member.

Discography

Albums
Fresh - Specialist Subject Records, 12" LP, CD, Cassette, MP3 (2017)
Withdraw - Specialist Subject Records, 12" LP, CD, MP3 (2019)
Raise Hell - Specialist Subject Records (UK) / Get Better Records (USA), 12" LP, CD, Cassette, MP3 (2022)

Extended plays
Gewingchum - Self Released, MP3 (2015) / Specialist Subject Records, Cassette (2017)
These Things Are Not That Fun - Self Released, MP3 (2015) / Specialist Subject Records, Cassette (2017)
The Summer I Got Good At Guitar - Specialist Subject Records, 12" EP, Cassette, MP3 (2021)
Fresh Comes Alive! - Self-released, MP3 (2022)

Singles
"Daytime" / "Nighttime" - Specialist Subject Records, 7", MP3 (2018)
"Willa" - Specialist Subject Records, MP3 (2019)
"Going to Brighton" - Specialist Subject Records, MP3 (2019)
"New Girl" - Specialist Subject Records, MP3 (2019)
"Cinema Woes" - Specialist Subject Records, MP3 (2019)
"Girl Clout" - Specialist Subject Records, MP3 (2021)

References

Underground punk scene in the United Kingdom
Musical groups from London
Musical groups established in 2015
English indie rock groups
English punk rock groups
Specialist Subject Records artists
2015 establishments in England